John Pilkington Hudson,  (24 July 1910 – 6 December 2007) was an English horticultural scientist who did pioneer work on long-distance transportability of what became known as the kiwifruit. He was also a celebrated bomb disposal expert.

Background
Hudson was born on 24 July 1910 in Buxton, Derbyshire, to William Arthur Hudson (1884–1976), a post-office employee from Cheshire, and his wife Bertha, née Pilkington (1887–1969), daughter of a local coal merchant. He had a younger sister, Margaret. He attended New Mills Secondary School, but left at 16 to work in a garden nursery his father had started at Chapel-en-le-Frith. Nonetheless, he showed an early interest in physics.

After a one-year course in horticulture, he went on to take a University of London external degree in the subject at the Midland Agricultural and Dairy College in Sutton Bonington, and briefly lectured there in 1935. In 1936 he married Mary Gretta Heath (1910–1989), a dairy chemist, daughter of William Nathaniel Heath, farmer. They had two sons, Colin and Richard. They lived in Plumpton, East Sussex for three years while Hudson worked as an East Sussex County Council horticultural adviser.

Bomb disposal
Shortly before the Second World War, Hudson joined the Territorial Army. He immediately saw action in France and was evacuated from Dunkirk. He was then assigned to bomb disposal with the Royal Engineers, heading a group in Sheffield. There his scientific acumen stood him in good stead and he was summoned to work on new defusing methods in London, with the rank of major.

Hudson's war career included several months in the United States liaising with bomb disposal experts there. He was appointed a Member of the Order of the British Empire. He was awarded a George Medal in 1943 for disabling the first anti-tamper Y bomb fuse on 24 January 1943, six days after an intact fuse had first been recovered. According to an obituarist:

In 1944 he received a Bar to his George Medal for defusing the first V1 flying bomb or "doodlebug" to land intact. The nature of his war work remained unknown to friends until a Channel 4 television series on defusing was shown in 2001.

Research career
After the war, Hudson found work in the government agricultural department in Wellington, on the transportability of Actinidia deliciosa, then known as the Chinese gooseberry, now as the kiwifruit or kiwi. Seeds of the fruit had been introduced into New Zealand from China in the early 20th century. He was also involved in setting up a research station at Levin, New Zealand.

In 1948 the Hudsons returned to England, where he became a lecturer in horticulture at Sutton Bonington, by then a faculty of the new University of Nottingham. After obtaining a PhD degree in 1954, he became the first occupant of the university's chair of horticulture in 1958 and then dean of the faculty of agriculture and horticulture in 1965. His research was in the field of plant propagation, notably environmental factors in plant growth. He showed almost military precision in his research and administrative work, which he shared in 1961–1963 with the department of horticulture at the University of Khartoum, where he was seconded for six months each year as a visiting professor.

Hudson left Nottingham in 1967 to direct the Long Ashton Research Station, the job being coupled with a chair of horticultural science at the University of Bristol. There his administrative abilities were stretched further by government spending cuts and the need for full reorganisation. He was already editor (1965–1982) of the journal Experimental Agriculture and serving on other editorial boards. He was noted also for the precision and clarity of his teaching. Peter Waister, a former graduate student of Hudson's, stated at his funeral, "I was impressed by his ability to balance the three areas [of research, teaching and advisory work] and to be inspirational in them all, a rare achievement."

Hudson's honours included an associateship of honour of the Royal New Zealand Institute of Horticulture in 1948, the presidency of the former Horticultural Educational Association, founder membership and an honorary fellowship of the UK Institute of Horticulture, appointment as a Commander of the Order of the British Empire for services to horticulture in 1975, and in 1976 the Victoria Medal of Honour from the Royal Horticultural Society.

Retirement
John and Gretta Hudson retired to Wrington, Somerset, where they developed a large garden, which Hudson tended almost unaided into his nineties. Other interests included the local choral society, gliding, volunteering for the Weston-super-Mare Samaritans, and fell-walking. He acted as carer for his wife after she suffered a stroke in 1986. His son Colin, a tropical agronomist in Barbados, predeceased him in 2004. He was survived by his son Richard, a professor of linguistics at University College, London. He died on 6 December 2007 of kidney failure aged 97.

References

External sources
The website created by his son Richard: http://dickhudson.com/family/#John
James Owen: Danger UXB: The Heroic Story of the WWII Bomb Disposal Teams (London: Little, Brown, 2010) gives a lengthy account of the wartime work in which Hudson was involved.
Another account of his bomb disposal work: Retrieved 24 July 2011.

1910 births
2007 deaths
People from Buxton
English horticulturists
Bomb disposal personnel
Commanders of the Order of the British Empire
Recipients of the George Medal
Victoria Medal of Honour recipients
Deaths from kidney failure
British Army personnel of World War II
Royal Engineers officers